Joseph Colley (born 13 April 1999) is a Swedish professional footballer who plays as a centre-back for I liga side Wisła Kraków.

Club career 
Beginning his footballing career with Bro IK's, IF Brommapojkarna's, and Chelsea's youth academies, Colley signed with Serie B club Chievo in the summer of 2019. In 2021, he joined IK Sirius on loan over the 2021 Allsvenskan season.

On 18 January 2022, he signed a three-and-a-half-year deal with Polish Ekstraklasa club Wisła Kraków.

International career 
Colley has represented the Sweden U17 and U19 teams.

Personal life 
Colley was born in Kanifing, Gambia and moved to Sweden in 2008.

Career statistics

Club

References

External links

Living people
1999 births
Swedish people of Gambian descent
Swedish footballers
Sweden youth international footballers
Association football defenders
A.C. ChievoVerona players
IK Sirius players
Wisła Kraków players
Allsvenskan players
Ekstraklasa players
Swedish expatriate footballers
Swedish expatriate sportspeople in Italy
Swedish expatriate sportspeople in Poland
Expatriate footballers in Italy
Expatriate footballers in Poland